Nikola Gajovský (born February 24, 1987) is a Czech professional ice hockey player. He played with BK Mladá Boleslav in the Czech Extraliga during the 2010–11 Czech Extraliga season.

References

External links

1987 births
Living people
BK Mladá Boleslav players
Czech ice hockey forwards
Sportspeople from Písek
Sportovní Klub Kadaň players
EV Regensburg players
Piráti Chomutov players
IHC Písek players
HC Vrchlabí players
Czech expatriate ice hockey players in the United States
Naturalized citizens of Germany